Charlestown Shopping Centre is a shopping centre located on St. Margaret's Road, Dublin, Ireland, north of Finglas village. It opened in October 2007.

Shops
Dunnes Stores is the anchor tenant; other tenants include Sports Direct, Boots, Eddie Rocket's and Ulster Bank.

Later phases
Phase two of the shopping centre opened in October 2015. It consisted of a nine screen Odeon cinema, and a Leisureplex which includes bowling and Quasar facilities. Phase three consisted of 3 car showrooms and opened in 2019.

References

External links
Charlestown Shopping Centre

Shopping centres in County Dublin
Shopping malls established in 2007
Buildings and structures in Fingal
21st-century architecture in the Republic of Ireland